Robert Bennett Byerly (March 20, 1916 – May 8, 1945) was an American-born Canadian soldier, who was an agent for the British Special Operations Executive (SOE) during World War II.

Background
Byerly was a graduate of the University of Chicago, and before the outbreak of the Second World War worked as a journalist and schoolteacher. He was in Paris when Germany invaded France in 1940, but was permitted to leave to the United Kingdom as he was an American citizen. In April 1941, Byerly enlisted in the Canadian Army's Royal Canadian Corps of Signals. A skilled radio operator and linguist, Byerly received advanced wireless training in England in 1943, whereupon he was commissioned in the Canadian Army and recruited to the United Kingdom's Special Operations Executive on July 3, 1943, and given a new identity as "Robert Antoine Breuil".

On February 7, 1944, Byerly was one of four SOE agents parachuted into Chartres, France to carry out a mission. However, the Germans had managed to intercept the SOE's radio transmissions and captured the agents just after they landed. Byerly and the other agents were interrogated at Chartres, and then transferred to a Gestapo prison at 3 bis Place des États-Unis in Paris, but having been captured immediately upon their arrival, they had little knowledge of local underground resistance activity.

Disappearance
In July 1944, Byerly was transported from Paris, most likely to the Gross-Rosen concentration camp in Poland. He was not seen or heard from again, and was reported as missing and presumed executed. In the absence of any further information regarding his whereabouts, his date of death was recorded in his SOE personnel record as May 8, 1946 (a year after hostilities ceased in Europe). Byerly is listed on memorials at Gross-Rosen, the Valençay SOE Memorial in France, and at Brookwood Memorial in England.

Notes
 As stated above, Byerly's SOE personnel record lists his death as May 8, 1946 but the Canadian Virtual War Memorial lists his date of death as May 8, 1945.
 Byerly is listed on the SOE memorial at Gross-Rosen, where he is presumed to have been executed, however SOE expert Nigel Perrin cites a possibly contradictory deposition from the commandant of the Sicherheitsdienst in Paris, Josef Kieffer, which stated that Byerly was transported to Rawicz, and an unverified claim from a prisoner that he met him at Flossenbürg concentration camp in Germany.

See also
List of people who disappeared

References

1916 births
1940s missing person cases
1945 deaths
Canadian Army officers
Canadian Army personnel of World War II
Canadian military personnel killed in World War II
Canadian prisoners of war in World War II
Military personnel who died in Nazi concentration camps
Missing in action of World War II
People from Drexel Hill, Pennsylvania
People who died in Gross-Rosen concentration camp
Special Operations Executive personnel
University of Chicago alumni
World War II prisoners of war held by Germany
Royal Canadian Corps of Signals soldiers